The México Cricket Club was a former Mexican football team that played in the Liga Mexicana de Football Amateur Association. This club was founded in the small town San Pedro de los Pinos, which is now subsumed as part of greater Mexico City. From 1894 to 1903, Mexico Cricket Club played under the name Mexican National Cricket Club, but later changed its title to San Pedro Golf (1905–06) and then to Mexico Country Club (1906–08).

History
The club's history dates back to 1894 mainly playing cricket, a sport that, like football, was introduced into Mexico by English emigrant workers and was popular at the time and practiced in cities such as Puebla City , Pachuca , Monterrey and Mexico City. In 1897 the club joined the Mexican National Cricket Club where each of the mentioned cities had a representative club, such as Puebla A.C. .

Honours
 Liga Mexicana Amateur Association (1):
 1903–04

References

Defunct football clubs in Mexico City
Association football clubs established in 1894
Association football clubs disestablished in 1908
1894 establishments in Mexico
1908 disestablishments in Mexico
Primera Fuerza teams

es:México Cricket Club